Decatur is a given name and a surname which may refer to:
 Daniel Decatur Emmet (1815–1904), songwriter
 Art Decatur (1894-1966), Major League Baseball pitcher
 C. D. Howe (Clarence Decatur Howe, 1886-1960), Canadian cabinet minister and businessman
 Sean M. Decatur (born 1969) African-American chemist, college administrator and 19th president of Kenyon College
 Stephen Decatur (1779-1820), influential American naval commodore
 Stephen Decatur Sr. (1751–1808), American naval captain in the Revolutionary War
 Decatur Dorsey (1836-1891), African-American Union Army soldier and Medal of Honor recipient
 Decatur "Bucky" Trotter (1932-2004), African-American politician
 Doug Decatur (1958-), Baseball writer and grand-nephew of Art Decatur